Douglas Krueger is an American philosopher, academic and author.  He is best known as a proponent of atheism and an advocate of skepticism regarding supernatural and paranormal claims.  Krueger has been a featured speaker at numerous atheist and humanist conventions and gatherings and is a co-founder of the Fayetteville Freethinkers, a secular humanist organization in Fayetteville, Arkansas.  His book, What is Atheism: A Short Introduction, is a critique of religious belief, especially Christianity.  He has discussed his atheistic views on numerous radio shows and participated in more than a dozen debates across the United States on the existence of God and secular ethics.

Krueger resides in Fayetteville, Arkansas, is father to four children, and is employed as a full-time faculty member at Northwest Arkansas Community College, where he teaches philosophy.  He holds bachelors, masters, and doctoral degrees in philosophy.

Bibliography
 What is Atheism - A short introduction, Douglas E Krueger, Prometheus Books, New York, 1998 

American educators
American atheists
American non-fiction writers
Critics of Christianity
Living people
Year of birth missing (living people)